Graeme Meldrum Smith (born 8 June 1983) is a Scottish footballer who plays as a goalkeeper who has professionally retired. He started his career at Rangers and has also played for Ross County, Motherwell, Brighton, Hibernian, Gabala, Partick Thistle, Ayr United, Brechin City, Stenhousemuir and Berwick Rangers.

Career
Smith was born in Edinburgh. He started his career with Rangers but failed to make an appearance for the club. During his time at Ibrox, Smith spent the 2003–04 season on loan to Scottish First Division side Ross County.

Motherwell
On 25 June 2005, Smith signed for Motherwell. During four seasons at Fir Park, Smith made 127 SPL appearances for Motherwell. Smith was included in the Scotland squad to face the Faroe Islands and Lithuania in Euro 2008 qualifiers played in September 2006, but he did not play in either game. Smith made one appearance for the Scotland B team during this time, playing in a 1–1 draw with the Republic of Ireland B team in November 2007. He was part of the Motherwell side that finished third in the SPL in the 2007–08 season, qualifying for the 2008–09 UEFA Cup.

Brighton & Hove Albion
On 1 July 2009, Smith transferred to English League One side Brighton & Hove Albion, signing a two-year contract. However, he conceded five goals on his debut, coming as a substitute after the regular goalkeeper Michel Kuipers had been sent off, as Brighton lost 7–1 at Huddersfield. Smith went on to make nine further appearances for Brighton.

Hibernian
Smith returned to the SPL on 1 January 2010 by signing for Hibernian on a free transfer. He immediately took possession of the goalkeeper position at Hibs, as manager John Hughes sought to put a "goalkeeping school" in place. Smith was involved in a remarkable game towards the end of the 2009–10 season, as he conceded six goals against his former club Motherwell, the match finishing drawn 6–6. Smith eventually fell behind Mark Brown and Graham Stack in the selection order under the management of Colin Calderwood and was released by the club in April 2011. He had made only 16 league appearances during his 15 months with the club.

Gabala
Smith was invited by Tony Adams to train with Azerbaijan Premier League club Gabala in July 2011. Smith signed a one-year contract with Gabala after a pre-season tour of England. He made his debut for Gabala in an Azerbaijan Cup tie against Neftchala, in which they won 3–0. Smith made his league debut on 7 March in a 3–2 defeat against Kəpəz. On 17 May, Smith's contract was not renewed by Gabala.

Return to Scotland
Smith trained with Dunfermline, in his native Scotland, in July 2012. On 13 November 2012, he signed a 9-week deal with Scottish First Division club Partick Thistle. Smith scored an own goal in his debut appearance for Thistle, a 1–0 defeat against Hamilton on 16 November. He left the club at the end of his contract.

Smith signed a contract with Ayr United in February 2013 for the remainder of the season.

Brechin City
On 3 July 2013, Smith signed for Scottish League One side Brechin City. He signed a new two-year contract on 19 May 2014.

On 21 November 2015, Smith travelled to the Ochilview ground for the away game against Stenhousemuir. Unfortunately for him, the match was actually a home fixture for Brechin, 83 miles away. He did make it in time to play, but the side lost 2–1.

Smith extended his contract with Brechin City for another year on 1 June 2016. After five year with Brechin, Smith left Glebe Park at the end of the 2017–18 season.

Stenhousemuir
On 22 May 2018, Smith signed a two-year contract with Scottish League One side Stenhousemuir. On 22 April 2022, Smith joined Lowland League side Berwick Rangers on an emergency loan for the remainder of the 2021–22 season.

Career statistics

Honours
Rangers
Scottish League Cup: 2005

Notes

References

External links 

Living people
1983 births
Footballers from Edinburgh
Association football goalkeepers
Scottish footballers
Scotland under-21 international footballers
Scotland B international footballers
Rangers F.C. players
Ross County F.C. players
Motherwell F.C. players
Brighton & Hove Albion F.C. players
Hibernian F.C. players
Scottish Premier League players
Scottish Football League players
English Football League players
Gabala FC players
Scottish expatriate footballers
Expatriate footballers in Azerbaijan
Partick Thistle F.C. players
Ayr United F.C. players
Brechin City F.C. players
Scottish Professional Football League players
Stenhousemuir F.C. players
Berwick Rangers F.C. players